A series of uncoordinated mass stabbings, hammer attacks, and cleaver attacks in the People's Republic of China began in March 2010.  The spate of attacks left at least 90 dead and some 473 injured. As most cases had no known motive, analysts have blamed mental health problems caused by rapid social change for the rise in these kinds of mass murder and murder-suicide incidents.

As the Chenpeng school attack was followed by the Sandy Hook Elementary School shooting in the United States hours later comparisons were drawn between the two. The difference in gun control laws between the two countries was used to explain the disparity in casualties of the school attacks by journalists and politicians, including U.S. Representative Jerry Nadler, and an article in the Associated Press noted that despite the different outcomes, an underlying commonality between the attacks was the increased frequency of school attacks because "attackers often seek out the vulnerable, hoping to amplify their outrage before they themselves often commit suicide."

March 2010

On March 23, 2010, Zheng Minsheng (郑民生) 41,  murdered eight children with a knife in  an elementary school in Nanping, Fujian province; The attack was widely reported in Chinese media (called 南平实验小学重大凶杀案), sparking fears of copycat crimes. Following a quick trial, Zheng Minsheng was executed about one month later on April 28. Media reported a history of mental health issues, but police stated that Zheng had no history of mental illness, contradicting earlier reports. Zheng said that he performed the attack after being turned down by a girl and suffering "unfair treatment" from the girl's wealthy family.

April  2010
On April 13, a mentally ill man went on a stabbing rampage at Xizhen Primary School in Xichang, southern Guangxi, killing an eight-year-old boy and an 80-year-old woman passerby. It was the second random attack on schoolchildren in the mainland in three weeks. Also injured were five people - two boys, aged seven and 12, a seven-year-old girl and a couple in their 30s. The knife-wielding suspect, Yang Jiaqin, aged 40, was detained.

On April 28, just a few hours after the execution of Zheng Minsheng in neighboring Fujian Province, in Leizhou, Guangdong another knife-wielding man named Chen Kangbing, 33 (陈康炳) at Hongfu Primary School wounded 16 students and a teacher. Chen Kangbing had been a teacher at a different primary school in Leizhou, but was on sick leave due to mental illness He was sentenced to death by a court in Zhanjiang in June.

On April 29 in Taixing, Jiangsu, unemployed 47-year-old Xu Yuyuan went to Zhongxin Kindergarten and stabbed 28 students and two teachers after stabbing the  security guard; most of the Taixing students were 4 years old. The attack was the second in China in just two days.

On April 30, Wang Yonglai used a hammer to cause head injury to preschool children in Weifang, Shandong, then used gasoline to commit suicide by self-immolation.

May 2010

An attacker named Wu Huanming (吴环明), 48, killed seven children and two adults and injured 11 other persons with a cleaver at a kindergarten in Hanzhong, Shaanxi on May 12, 2010; early reports were removed from the internet in China, for fear that mass coverage of such violence could provoke copycat attacks. The attacker later committed suicide at his house; he was the landlord of the school,  Shengshui Temple private kindergarten, and had been involved in an ongoing dispute with the school administrator about when the school would move out of the building.

On May 18, 2010 at Hainan Institute of Science and Technology (海南科技职业学院), a vocational college in Haikou, Hainan, more than 10 men charged into a dormitory wielding knives around 2:30 am; after attacking the security guard and disabling security cameras, 9 students were injured, 1 seriously.  The local men attacked the dorm in an act of revenge and retaliation against college students following conflict the previous day at an off-campus food stall in which 4 students were injured, for a total of 13.

August 2010

On 4 August 2010, 26-year-old Fang Jiantang (方建堂) slashed more than 20 children and staff with a 60 cm knife, killing three children and a teacher at a kindergarten in Zibo, Shandong province. Of the injured, 3 other children and 4 teachers were taken to the hospital. After being caught Fang confessed to the crime. There was no known motive. Since the start of the year, a total of 27 people had died and at least 80 were injured in various knife attacks.

August 2011
Eight children, between the ages of three and five,  were hurt in Minhang District, Shanghai when an employee at a child-care centre for migrant workers  slashed the children with a box-cutter. The woman had worked there for years, but was thought to have psychiatric problems.

September 2011
In September 2011, a young girl and three adults taking their children to nursery school were killed in Gongyi, Henan by 30-year-old  Wang Hongbin with an axe. Another child and an adult were seriously wounded but survived. The suspect is a local farmer who is suspected of being mentally ill.

September 2012
On 21 September 2012, three children died and 13 more were injured after a suspected mental patient allegedly broke into a nursery in the Guangxi Zhuang autonomous region and attacked students with a knife. The suspect, Wu Yechang, aged 25, was caught on-site by police officers, who rushed to the nursery after receiving emergency calls.

December 2012

On 14 December 2012, a 36-year-old villager in the village of Chenpeng, Henan Province, stabbed 23 children and an elderly woman at the village's primary school as children were arriving for classes. The attacker was restrained at the school, and later arrested. All of the victims survived and were treated at three hospitals, though some were reportedly seriously injured, with fingers or ears cut off, and had to be transferred to larger hospitals for specialized care.

March 2013

A knife-wielding attacker has killed two relatives and then slashed 11 people, including six children, outside a school in China's commercial hub of Shanghai. The man, whose surname was given as Zang, killed his sister and his sister's mother-in-law at their home in a family dispute over money on Wednesday, the Shanghai Daily newspaper said. Zang then attacked parents and children outside an elementary school in the suburban district of Fengxian just as classes were let out, it said.

Two boys have died after they were beaten by a member of staff at a primary school in southern China, state media report. The boys, who attended a private school in Yulin City, in the Guangxi Zhuang region, died later in hospital, Xinhua news agency says.

September 2013

Two adults were killed outside Balijie Primary School, and 44 others were injured after a homemade explosive detonated. Most of the injured were schoolchildren. One of those killed is the bomber, who was riding his motorcycle during the explosion.

May 2014

A man armed with a meat-cleaver slashed eight children on a playground. Eight students were injured; one was seriously injured and seven others sustained minor injuries. A 35-year-old man was arrested.

September 2014

A man stabbed three children to death at a primary school in central China and then committed suicide by jumping off a building, state media reported. The attacker, identified by his surname Chen, broke into Dongfang Primary School in Hubei province around 10:20 a.m, Xinhua news agency said, citing the local government. Wielding a knife, the man stabbed eight students and a teacher before he took his own life, the report said.

February 2016

A man in southern China stabbed 10 schoolchildren before killing himself Monday morning, state-run media reported.
All of the children survived and were hospitalized, the state-run Xinhua news agency reported.
The incident took place in Haikou, the capital city of the southern island province of Hainan.
The motive for the attack remains unclear.

September 2016
Four children were stabbed to death as they were walking to their school. A 56-year-old suspect is wanted.

November 2016

Around 11:40 a.m. 58-year-old Lei Mingyue entered an after-school care center in Hantai District and attacked students lining up for lunch with an axe. After wounding seven female students from Beiguan Primary School he fled the premises, injuring two passersby during his escape. He was later arrested by police and stated he carried out the attack as revenge on society after he was arrested twice for theft.

May 2017

A driver angry over the loss of overtime pay set fire to his school bus in the eastern city of Weihai, killing 13 people, including 11 children from China and South Korea. The driver bought gasoline which he ignited while the bus was travelling through a tunnel in the coastal city that is home to many South Korea businesses. Police determined that the fire started on the floor of the bus next to the driver's seat, where the cap to a cigarette lighter and gasoline residue were found. All 13 people aboard the bus were killed, including the driver himself and a teacher.

June 2017

On 15 June 2017, a bombing at a kindergarten in Feng County, Xuzhou, Jiangsu province, east China, killed at least eight people and injured 65 others. The perpetrator, 22-year-old Xu Taoran, died in the blast. Subsequent investigation revealed that Xu was mentally ill and obsessed with death and destruction. The blast occurred at the entrance of the kindergarten, while children were leaving school. Two people died on the spot, and five succumbed to injuries at the hospital. Nine remained in critical condition in the aftermath. Due to the shattering bomb parts, over 60 people were injured and needed medical attention.

April 2018

The death toll has risen to nine in Friday's stabbing attack outside a middle school in northwestern China allegedly carried out by a former pupil seeking revenge for having been bullied. The Mizhi county government in Shaanxi province reported that another 10 people have been hospitalized with injuries resulting from the rampage outside the No. 3 Middle School in the rural area that took place as classes were being dismissed for the evening.

June 2018

On June 28, outside Shanghai World Foreign Language Primary School, one of the best private elementary schools in the city, a man attacked three schoolboys and a mother with a kitchen knife, fatally wounding two boys and injuring the others.
According to a statement from the Shanghai police, posted on its Weibo account, the attacker, 29, was caught by pedestrians at the scene. Unemployed, he arrived in Shanghai in early June but failed to find a job. To “take revenge on society,” he decided to commit the crime, the man told the police.

October 2018

A knife-wielding assailant injured 14 children at a kindergarten in the western Chinese city of Chongqing on Friday morning, police reported. The attacker, a 39-year-old woman, was taken into custody. No motive for the assault was immediately publicized.

January 2019

A 49-year-old man has been arrested after attacking 20 children at a primary school in Beijing with a hammer.
The Xicheng district government said in a post on its Weibo account three of the children suffered heavy injuries and were in a stable condition. There were no reports of any deaths.

March 2019

On the afternoon of March 14, 2019, a man attacked students near the Guanghuadao Primary School and 17 students were injured

September 2019

An attacker killed eight students and injured two others at an elementary school in central China on the first day of the new semester, police said Tuesday. The attack occurred around 8 a.m. Monday in Chaoyangpo village of Enshi city in Hubei province, Enshi police said in a statement. The suspect was a 40-year-old man surnamed Yu. How the children were attacked was not disclosed and the motive for the attack was unclear. According to the Guangzhou-based Southern Weekly, which cited staff from Hubei prison, the suspect was released last June after serving his sentence for attempted murder.

November 2019

More than 50 people, almost all of them young children, were hospitalized in southwest China on Tuesday after a man broke into a kindergarten and sprayed them with a corrosive chemical as “revenge on society.” Fifty-one children and three teachers were injured in the attack in Kaiyuan, in Yunnan province, local authorities said. Two were seriously injured, but their injuries were not life-threatening, according to a report from Xinhua news agency.

June 2020
39 people (37 students and two adults) are injured in a knife attack at a primary school. The students suffered mild injuries; two adults suffered more severe injuries.

December 2020

On December 27, 2020, seven people were killed and seven others injured during a mass stabbing attack outside a school in Kaiyuan, in the Liaoning province. As the school was closed at the time of the incident, no students or teachers were hurt. The victims were all passersby, mainly middle-aged or elderly women. The attacker then stabbed and wounded a policeman before being arrested.

April 2021

On April 29, 2021, a knife-wielding man broke into a school killing two children and wounding 16 others. The mass stabbing occurred in Beiliu, a city in the Guangxi Zhuang Autonomous Region of southern China. A man with the surname Zeng, aged 24, was apprehended by police. Authorities didn't confirm a motive for the attack, but Hong Kong news outlets, including Oriental Daily and Apple Daily, reported that the suspect was going through a divorce and his wife worked at the school.

August 2022

On August 3, 2022, three people were killed and six others wounded in a knife attack at a kindergarten in southeast China's Jiangxi province. Police said the suspect, identified as 48-year-old Liu Xiaohui, fled to a mountainous area in a neighboring county after the attack, and was arrested 12 hours later.

Causes
Prof. Joshua Miller, chair of Social Welfare Policy  at Smith College, attributed the attacks to stress caused by  "rapid social change, mass migrations, increasing disparities in wealth and weakening of traditions." Some sociologists believe some of these attacks may be due to the PRC government's failure to diagnose and treat mental illness. The perpetrators may feel victimized by stress due to the rapid social changes in China during the last 10 years caused by the privatization and decreased social security of China's reform and opening period. During this time, more and more migrant workers from rural areas have moved to cities such as Shanghai to find jobs. However, because they do not have social security (because of the hukou system), many of them do not have health insurance. Because of the financial crisis of 2007–2010, some have lost their jobs, which is stigmatized in China, and have had to return to their native villages jobless and unemployed. The choice of schools for most of the attacks means they could be copycat crimes.

Another factor is China's male-based gender imbalance cause by the one child policy, in which there are a lot of single men frustrated at the dating market in China and their low prospects. They are then more likely to resort to violence.

Reaction and response
Since the recent spate of attacks, many parents are now worried about their children's safety in schools and have since asked local officials and school governors to step up security at the schools. The education ministry has formed an emergency panel to tackle the violence and some local police authorities have distributed such instruments as steel pitchforks and pepper spray to security guards in schools. However, not all schools increased their security because of lack of funds to hire extra security. The state media has also been keeping news of these attacks quiet by deleting forum entries on the internet and releasing few facts on the incident for fear of copycat crimes and mass panic. In May 2010, Chinese Premier Wen Jiabao commented on the school attacks and said that the "social tensions" in China must be addressed. He also said society was changing rapidly and that subsequent changes in policy were needed. Why these attacks have been specifically targeted at young school children is not entirely explicable, however.

Following the Chenpeng school attack, the Chinese government began posting security guards in schools throughout the country. It was planned that all schools have a security guard by 2013.

See also
List of countries by intentional homicide rate
Social issues in the People's Republic of China
Crime in China
Mental health in China
Hebei tractor rampage
Yongzhou courthouse shooting
Chenpeng Village Primary School stabbing

References

External links

 
 
 
 

Education in China
Student politics in China
Murder–suicides in China
Suicides in the People's Republic of China
Mass murder in 2010
Mass murder in 2011
Mass murder in 2012
 
 
School killings in China
Knife attacks
2010 murders in China
2011 murders in China
2012 murders in China
2013 murders in China
2014 murders in China
2016 murders in China
2018 murders in China
2019 murders in China
2020 murders in China
2021 murders in China